Karuna Supreme is an album by American jazz saxophonist John Handy and sarod player Ali Akbar Khan which was recorded in 1975 and originally released on the MPS label.

Reception

Allmusic awarded the album 4½ stars stating "Karuna Supreme, recorded in 1975, is one of the earliest true fusions of Indian music and jazz, and remains one of the most successful... The level of communication among the players throughout this session would be difficult to surpass. This is one of those rare East-meets-West recordings that absolutely succeeds at every level. Highly recommended".

Track listing
 "Ganesha's Jubilee Dance" (Ali Akbar Khan, John Handy) - 9:19
 "Karuna Supreme" ( Ali Akbar Khan) - 11:06 
 "The Soul and the Atma" (Ali Akbar Khan, Ustad Allauddin Khan) - 20:44

Personnel 
John Handy - alto saxophone 
Ali Akbar Khan - sarod
Zakir Hussain - tabla
Yogish S. Sahota - tanpura

References 

1976 albums
John Handy albums
MPS Records albums